Lanka de Alwis was a Sri Lankan cricketer. He was a wicket-keeper who played for Moratuwa Sports Club.

De Alwis made a single first-class appearance for the side, during the 1995–96 season, against Singha Sports Club. From the tailend, he scored 8 not out in the first innings in which he batted, and 6 not out in the second.

Moratuwa lost the match by an innings margin.

External links
Lanka de Alwis at CricketArchive 

Sri Lankan cricketers
Moratuwa Sports Club cricketers
Living people
Year of birth missing (living people)